The Los Angeles Chargers are an American football franchise who play in the National Football League (NFL). They began play in Los Angeles in 1960 as charter members of the American Football League (AFL), switched cities to San Diego the following season, and returned to Los Angeles in 2017. The AFL was formed as rivals to the established NFL, though the leagues would later merge, with all AFL teams including the Chargers officially joining the NFL in 1970.

Every year during April, each NFL franchise seeks to add new players to its roster through a collegiate draft known as the NFL Player Selection Meeting, which is more commonly known as the NFL Draft. The Chargers took part in the rival AFL draft for the first seven years of their existence, meaning that they had to compete for new players' signatures with whichever club had picked them in the NFL draft. Their first draft selection was Monty Stickles, an end from the University of Notre Dame. Unlike all future picks, he was not chosen by the Chargers themselves, but rather assigned in a territorial draft at a meeting of the AFL's original owners. Stickles never played for the Chargers as he chose to sign for the San Francisco 49ers instead; overall, the Chargers were unable to sign their first-round selection four times during their first seven years. After that, the two leagues conducted a common draft, ending the inter-league bidding war. Over a decade later, the original United States Football League (USFL) challenged the NFL by conducting its own collegiate drafts from 1983 to 1986. The Chargers temporarily lost two of their first-round picks (Gary Anderson and Mossy Cade) to USFL clubs, though both joined the NFL in 1985 as the USFL struggled financially.

In the NFL draft, teams are ranked in inverse order based on the previous season's record, with the worst record picking first, and the second worst picking second and so on. Teams have the option of trading away their picks to other teams for different picks, players, or a combination thereof. Thus, it is not uncommon for a team's actual draft pick to differ from their assigned draft pick, or for a team to have extra or no draft picks in any round due to these trades. The Chargers have been without a first-round pick eight times in their history, including six times in seven years from 1994 to 2000. They have possessed two first-round picks on seven different occasions; once, in 1983, they had three such picks.

The Chargers have twice been in possession of the No. 1 overall pick, though in neither case has the player selected played for them. In 2001, they traded the No. 1 pick to the Atlanta Falcons before the draft for three draft picks and one player; the Falcons selected Michael Vick, while the Chargers chose LaDainian Tomlinson with the No. 5 overall pick. In 2004, the projected No. 1 pick, Eli Manning, stated that he would not play in San Diego. The Chargers still selected him, but quickly traded the player to the New York Giants for Philip Rivers (who the Giants had just drafted at No. 4 overall) and three draft picks, one of which was used to select Shawne Merriman in the first round the following season.

Twenty-four of the Chargers's first round selections have been nominated for at least one Pro Bowl or AFL All-Star game; Junior Seau has the most such nominations, with twelve. Three have been elected to the Pro Football Hall of Fame: Kellen Winslow, Seau and LaDainian Tomlinson.

The team's most recent first-round pick was Zion Johnson, a guard from Boston College selected No. 17 overall in 2022. They have chosen 33 defensive players in the first round, and 30 offensive players; defensive linemen have been the most common position, with 13 selected. Ohio State, Tennessee and Texas are tied for the most players chosen by the Chargers from one university, with three selections each.

Player selections

Breakdowns

Footnotes

References 

Los Angeles Chargers

first-round draft picks